Andrea Di Renzo (born 24 January 1995) is an Italian former racing cyclist, who competed as a professional with  from 2020 to 2021. He is the son of Marco Antonio Di Renzo, who was a professional cyclist from 1996 to 2000.

Major results
2017
 3rd Giro del Casentino
2018
 3rd Overall Giro della Regione Friuli Venezia Giulia
2019
 3rd Overall Tour of Malopolska

References

External links

1995 births
Living people
Italian male cyclists
People from Lanciano
Cyclists from Abruzzo
Sportspeople from the Province of Chieti